SCICEX, standing for Scientific Ice Expeditions, was a five-year (1995–1999) scientific research program involving a collaboration between the U.S. Navy and academic researchers from a variety of different universities.  The object of study was geophysical and oceanological conditions in the Arctic Ocean.  The Navy made available a nuclear submarine for each research cruise.

Margo Edwards was the chief scientist for the 1999 expedition and spent thirteen days on the USS Hawkbill, thereby becoming the first women to live aboard a Navy nuclear submarine during under-ice operations. Edwards' research found evidence of climate change in the Arctic, including thinning sea ice, volcanoes on the seafloor, and warm water moving into the Arctic from the Atlantic Ocean. These data are available for anyone to view.

List of Expeditions 

 SCICEX/93 · USS Pargo
 SCICEX/95 · USS Cavalla
 SCICEX/96 · USS Pogy
 SCICEX/97 · USS Archerfish
 SCICEX/98 · USS Hawkbill
 SCICEX/99 · USS Hawkbill

External links 
SCICEX web site
2004 article on the SCICEX program in Arctic Research of the United States magazine
SCICEX/96 photo gallery on the USS Pogy web site
SCICEX/98 Navy Mission Report
SCICEX Phase 2 Memorandum of Agreement from 2000 on the Arctic Submarine Laboratory web site
SCICEX/99 page at the USS Hawkbill web site
SCICEX/99 page at the University of Alaska Fairbanks Institute of Marine Science
CNN documentary on SCICEX/99
Article on SCICEX/99 in Undersea Warfare magazine
USS Pogy Alumni Site

References 

Scientific organizations based in the United States
Oceanography
Environmental science
Arctic research